"I'll Go on Alone" is a song written and recorded by American country music artist Marty Robbins. Performers on the song include Slim Harbert on bass, Johnny Gimble on fiddle, Floyd Lanning on guitar, and Harold Carmack on piano.  The song was recorded at Jim Beck's studio.

Chart performance
The song reached number one on the US country chart in 1952.  It was Robbins' first hit single.

Other versions
Webb Pierce released a version of the song as a single in 1953.  It reached #4 on the country chart.
Bobby Lord released a version of the song as B-side to his single "My Heart Tells Me So" in 1961.
Bob Luman released a version as part of an EP in the United Kingdom in 1964.
Ernest Tubb released a version of the song on his 1969 album, Let's Turn Back the Years.

References

1952 songs
1952 debut singles
1953 singles
1961 singles
Songs written by Marty Robbins
Marty Robbins songs
Webb Pierce songs
Bob Luman songs
Ernest Tubb songs
Columbia Records singles
Decca Records singles